Florida Student Association was formed in 1976 and is a board of the Student Body Presidents from each of the State University System universities.    

Florida Student Association, Inc. (FSA) was formed in 1976 under the "Florida Not For Profit Corporation Act". FSA represents the interests of students of the State University System of Florida. A statute enacted by the Government of Florida has created a "student government" at each state university.  The statute provides that each student government shall have a "student body president". FSA's board of directors includes the student body president of each state university student government.  FSA's board of directors exercises the corporation's powers and manages its affairs.

Current Members

State University System 
The Universities represented in the Florida Student Association are those that are in the State University System of the State of Florida. The System is completely separate from the Florida Department of Education and State Board of Education, who control K-20, college, workforce and technical, blind, and VPK education.  U.S. News & World Report named Florida the No. 1 State University System in the United States for five years. In 2022, Governor Ron DeSantis signed the Freedom First Budget Bill which allocated $2.7 billion to the State University System.

Governance
FSA coordinates the collective efforts of each of the State University student governments with a goal of providing unified student representation before the Florida Government. FSA holds monthly meetings where student leaders can interact with their peers from other institutions.

Florida Board of Governors
The FSA president serves as a member of the board of governors without compensation but may be reimbursed for travel and per diem expenses to the extent provided by law. The current Student Body President that was elected as FSA Chair to serve on the Board of Governors is Nimna Gabadage from Florida State University. The Chair works to represent the interests of the more than 300,00 students that attend these universities statewide.

Financial Aid Appeals Committee
An applicant for state student financial aid may appeal the rejection of his or her application. The appeal will be heard by a committee of four members appointed by the Florida Commissioner of Education. A decision rendered by an appeals committee constitutes "final agency action".

An appeals committee is temporary in nature.  There might be no appeals committees in existence at a particular time or there might be several appeals committees, with each committee being assigned to evaluate one or more appeals.

FSA is authorized by law to nominate students to serve as members of appeals committees.  Each nominee must be enrolled in a public postsecondary institution in Florida.

Rally in Tally 
The Florida Student Association holds an annual gathering in Tallahassee called Rally in Tally. Students travel from each of the twelve universities in teams to lobby the Florida Legislature regarding education issues and concerns. Past speakers at Rally in Tally events include Mayor John E. Dailey, Sean Pittman, Amber Mariano (politician), Tim Cerio, and more.

Lobbying
FSA is authorized by law to "Adopt, change, amend, and repeal bylaws, not inconsistent with law or its articles of incorporation, for the administration of the affairs of the corporation and the exercise of its corporate powers". FSA has adopted a bylaw which provides, in part, that "the activities of the corporation shall include the carrying on of lobbying efforts and otherwise attempting to influence legislation".

In 2022, the Florida Student Association lobbied for the return of the $600 Bright Futures Book Stipend, increased resources even the statewide distribution of Title IX officers, a vast increase in mental health resources, and the installment of the Open Educational Resources. From the same session, Gov. Ron DeSantis signed a record $396 million for school safety and mental health initiatives.

In 2019, the Florida Student Association partnered with Representative Mel Ponder (R) and Senator Anitere Flores (R) to pass House Bill 3419, which would have provided additional funding to homelessness and food insecurity programs on college campuses. This bill eventually died in the Appropriations Committee. FSA also tried to partner with Mike Caruso (R)  to eliminate the tax on college textbooks and other instructional materials. The Florida Student Association lobbied successfully for the expansion of Florida's Medical Amnesty laws, which will protect those who call for assistance during an alcohol and drug overdose across the state through HB 595.

FSA was a driving force in the effort to create the "Florida Prepaid College Program". In 1985, FSA asked key Florida legislators to review the State of Michigan's prepaid tuition plan. After reviewing Michigan's plan, Florida State Senator Ileana Ros-Lehtinen sponsored a bill to establish a similar prepaid tuition plan in Florida. With lobbying efforts by student government presidents and David Corry (FSA Executive Director) and Shari Caprara (FSA Legislative Director), the Florida House of Representatives and the Florida Senate both passed the bill. The bill was then signed into law by Florida Governor Bob Martinez. Since that bill became Florida law, more than 1.6 million prepaid college plans have been purchased and nearly 350,000 students have attended college under a prepaid college plan. Most of the plans were purchased by parents and grandparents when their children/grandchildren were toddlers.

See also
 Advisory Council of Faculty Senates
 Florida Board of Governors
 Florida College System Activities Association
 State University System of Florida
 Florida College System

References

External links
 Official website
 FSA's "Profile" at Charity Navigator

Politics of Florida
Non-profit corporations
501(c)(3) organizations
Student governments in the United States
Education advocacy groups
Lobbying organizations in the United States
Organizations based in Florida
Charities based in Florida
Student political organizations
1976 establishments in Florida
State University System of Florida